Kabansky (masculine), Kabanskaya (feminine), or Kabanskoye (neuter) is the name of several rural localities in Russia:
Kabanskoye, Chelyabinsk Oblast, a selo in Bagaryaksky Selsoviet of Kaslinsky District of Chelyabinsk Oblast
Kabanskoye, Yaroslavl Oblast, a selo in Dubrovitsky Rural Okrug of Pereslavsky District of Yaroslavl Oblast